Chhatna Chandidas Mahavidyalaya , established in 2007, is the general degree college at Ghoramuli, Chhatna, Bankura district. It offers undergraduate courses in arts. It is affiliated to Bankura University.

Departments

Arts

Bengali
English
History
Sociology

Accreditation
The college is recognized by the University Grants Commission (UGC).

See also

References

External links 

Colleges affiliated to Bankura University
Universities and colleges in Bankura district
Educational institutions established in 2007
2007 establishments in West Bengal